Appleton Municipal Airport,  is a public use airport located 2 miles (3 km) northeast of the central business district of Appleton, a city in Swift County, Minnesota, United States.

Although most airports in the United States use the same three-letter location identifier for the FAA and International Air Transport Association (IATA), this airport is assigned AQP by the FAA but has no designation from the IATA. AQP is assigned to Rodríguez Ballón International Airport by the IATA.

Facilities and aircraft 
Appleton Municipal Airport covers an area of 20 acres (8 ha) at an elevation of 1,021 feet (311 m) above mean sea level. It has two runways: 13/31 is 3,500 by 75 feet (1,067 x 23 m) with an asphalt surface, it has an approved GPS approach; 4/22 is 2,770 by 157 feet (844 x 48 m) with an turf surface.

For the 12-month period ending June 30, 2017, the airport had 2,400 aircraft operations, an average of 46 per week: all general aviation.
In September 2019, there were 12 aircraft based at this airport: all single-engine.

See also
List of airports in Minnesota

References

External links 
 

Airports in Minnesota
Buildings and structures in Swift County, Minnesota